Gillian Barber (born 22 February 1958) is an English-born Canadian actress.

Early life and education 
Barber was born in Coventry, Warwickshire, England, and raised in British Columbia, Canada. She studied at the Guildhall School of Music and Drama in London, and BFA program in the University of Victoria.

Career 
Barber appeared in films such as The Stepfather, Needful Things, and Jumanji; in TV series such as The X-Files and Stargate SG-1; and in TV animation Sabrina: The Animated Series and Adventures from the Book of Virtues as voice actress.

Barber also teaches at Capilano University, British Columbia, and created the Musical Theatre program in 2007.

Filmography

Films

Television

References

External links 
 

1958 births
Living people
Canadian film actresses
Canadian television actresses
Canadian voice actresses
Actresses from Coventry
Actresses from British Columbia
English emigrants to Canada
Canadian expatriates in England
Alumni of the Guildhall School of Music and Drama
University of Victoria alumni
Academic staff of Capilano University